Heat Fetish is the fourth and final studio album released by American hardcore band The Bled. The album is their first release through Rise Records after parting ways with Vagrant Records in 2009. Heat Fetish was released on March 9, 2010.

Background
Following the tours in support of The Bled's 2007 studio album, Silent Treatment, the band announced that they would take a break from touring. Several members found themselves in debt after this choice, which forced members to take day jobs or temporarily join other bands. Ultimately, founding members Ross Ott and Mike Pedicone, in addition to bassist Darren Simoes who joined the band in 2004, chose to leave The Bled leaving only vocalist James Muñoz and guitarist Jeremy Talley. Muñoz and Talley wanted to "rock by any means necessary," and continue releasing music as The Bled. The former members were replaced by guitarist Robbie Burbidge, bassist Brad Murray and drummer Josh Skibar.

Prior to joining the band, Burbidge, Murray and Skibar were fans of The Bled. The new members brought an outside perspective of what fans like about the band to the writing process.

Track listing

Personnel
The Bled
 James Muñoz – vocals
 Robbie Burbidge – guitar
 Brad Murray – bass guitar
 Josh Skibar – drums
 Jeremy Ray Talley – guitar

Production
 Fernando "Nando" Rivas – engineer, mixer, mastering
 Stephen Looker – management

References

The Bled albums
Rise Records albums
2010 albums